Romblon State University is a public higher education institution in Romblon, Philippines. It has eight satellite campuses and its main campus is located in Odiongan, Romblon.

History
1914: Tracing its roots back in November 1914, during the district athletic meet in Odiongan, the Odiongan Farm School started only in the imagination when John C. Early, then head teacher of Romblon Sub Province suggested to teachers the idea of the establishment of a farm school in the locality to educate farmers in better farming methods.  

1915-1916: The Odiongan Farm School came into being in June 1915, with sixty-five pupils enrolled in the fifth grade and forty-eight pupils in the sixth grade. Juan Fetalino, the most promising teacher in the province, took charge of the school as a principal, and was assisted by Felipa Festin, another teacher of long experience in June 1916. A complete farming course for boys, and housekeeping and house course for girls were opened, with an averaged enrollment of forty pupils for each grade. 

1922-1930:In June 1922, a first year class was started and in June 1927 a second year class was added. The third and fourth year classes were organized in 1929 and in 1930, respectively. The name became Odiongan Rural High School intermediate classes were turned over to the Odiongan Elementary School. The realization of the establishment of the Odiongan Farm School has been largely due to the generosity and enthusiasm of the Odiongan people and through the earnest efforts of John C. Early. 

1947: In 1947, the Odiongan Rural High School was changed to Odiongan High School that offered a General Type A Curriculum. The demand for change continued to lurk the educational planners of the province. 

1958:The Odiongan High School was again converted to Odiongan National Agricultural School by virtue of Republic Act No. 1381 and the status remained for some time until the name was changed to Romblon National Agricultural School under General Appropriation Act in 1958.

1965:On July 1, 1965, then Congressman Jose D. Moreno of the defunct Congress of the Philippines authored Republic Act No. 4286 converting Romblon National Agricultural School to Romblon National Agricultural College. In the same Appropriations Act, the name Romblon National Agricultural College was shorted to Romblon Agricultural College, however collegiate course were not offered immediately after its conversion due to lack of funds. 

1974:The year 1974 was the year of fulfillment of the long cherished dream of the people. A two-year Associate in Agricultural Technology (AAT) was offered in compliance Memorandum Circular No.8.s 1974 it has an initial enrollment of twenty-five student (15 male and 10 female).

1975:In 1975, three degree courses were offered namely: Bachelor of Science in Agriculture, Bachelor of Science in Agricultural Education, and Bachelor of Science in Home Technology, thus giving more challenges to the college, bringing about positive changes in the life of the people of Romblon. The demand for the higher educational technologies and the quest for relevant education to national development goals are imperative alternatives that could not be ignored by the college authorities. 

1978:As early as 1978, the plan to convert the Romblon Agricultural College into State College was initiated. The superintendent of the College sought the assistance of the Sangguniang Panlalawigan for endorsement of the Interim Batasan Pambansa. Under the able leadership of Honorable Nemesio V. Ganan, Jr. Assemblyman for Region IV at the same time representing Romblon. He authored Parliamentary Bill 131, an act converting Romblon Agricultural College into Romblon State College and appropriating funds thereof. 

1983:The Bill was signed into Law on May 18, 1983 by the late President Ferdinand E. Marcos and became Batas Pambasa Blg. 393. 

1998:With the eagerness to have a University in the Province of Romblon, on September 2, 1998, Atty. Eleandro Jesus Fabic Madrona, Congressman, Lone District of Romblon, filed HB 3265 otherwise known as “An Act Converting the Romblon State College in the Municipality of Odiongan, Province of Romblon, into a State University, to be known as the Romblon State University, Appropriating Funds Therefor, and for other purposes.”

2001:Consequently, On January 12, 2001, the Romblon College of Fisheries and Forestry (RCFF) created under Batas Pambansa Blg.553 was integrated to Romblon State College by virtue of BOT Resolution No.3. S.2001 and renamed as RSC Tablas Branch in conformity with IGI-CSI Memorandum order No. 27, S.2001.  Subsequently on February 28, 2001, Sibuyan Polytechnic College (SPC) created by virtue of BP 614 was also integrated to Romblon State College under BOT Resolution No.11, S.2001 and renamed as RSC Sibuyan Branch. 

2009:October 14, 2009 marked the ultimate dream come true to the Romblomanons when then Pres.Gloria Macapagal Arroyo, an act establishing the ROMBLON STATE UNIVERSITY, signed Republic Act 9721.

Staff
 President: Merian Catajay-Mani, Ed.D., CESE
 Vice President for Administration and Finance: Tomas T. Faminial, CPA, DBA
 Vice President for Academic Affairs: Emelyn R. Villanueva, PhD
 Vice President for Research, Extension and Development: Emelyn F. Montoya , PhD 
 Chief, Presidential Management Staff and Board Secretary: Mr. John Fetalsana Rufon
 Dean, College of Agriculture, Fisheries, and Forestry: Julio Romeo T. Chavez, PhD
 Dean, College of Arts and Sciences: Mark C. Calimbo, PhD
 Dean, College of Education: Jun P. Dalisay, PhD
 Dean, College of Engineering and Technology: Engr. Alfredo F. Fortu, Jr., PhD
 Dean, College of Business and Accountancy: Marbeth M. Fadriquela
 Director, Institute of Information and Technology: Catherine Bhel B. Aguila, DIT
 Director, Institute of Criminal Justice Education: Poly D. Banagan
 Director, Senior High and Laboratory High School: Alfredo J. Fronda, Jr., PhD

President

Historical Names

Description
The Romblon State University (RSU) stays true and is on the course with its vision to be a premier higher education institution in the MIMAROPA Region. As the only government-owned tertiary education provider in the province of Romblon, RSU has established campuses in different islands to cater to the needs of Romblomanons as well as its neighboring provinces and respond to the limitations faced by its economically-challenged kasimanwa not to send their children to the main campus when they can have the same quality of education in their respective municipality.

Today, the university has nine campuses: the RSU-Odiongan Campus, the Main Campus at Odiongan, the RSU-Romblon Campus at Sawang, RSU-Tablas Campuses at San Andres, San Agustin, Sta. Maria, and Sta. Fe, RSU-Sibuyan Campuses in Cajidiocan and San Fernando.

Institute of Graduate Studies:

 Doctor in Philosophy in Educational Management
 Master of Arts in Business Administration
 Masters of Arts in Education
 Master in Educational Management
 Master of Science in Agriculture

College of Agriculture Fisheries, and Forestry

 Bachelor in Agricultural Technology
 Bachelor of Science in Agriculture

College of Arts and Sciences

 Bachelor of Science in Biology
 Bachelor of Arts in English
 Bachelor of Arts in Political Science
 Bachelor of Arts in Public Administration

College of Business and Accountancy

 Bachelor of Science in Accountancy
 Bachelor of Science in Business Administration
 Major in Operations Management
 Major in Financial Management
 Bachelor of Science in Hospitality Management

College of Education

 Bachelor in Elementary Education
 Bachelor in Secondary Education
 Major in General Science
 Major in MAPEH
 Major in English
 Major in Mathematics
 Major in Filipino
 Major in T.L.E.

College of Engineering and Technology

 Bachelor of Science in Agricultural and Bio systems Engineering
 Bachelor of Science in Civil Engineering
 Bachelor of Science in Electrical Engineering
 Bachelor of Science in Mechanical Engineering

Institute of Criminal Justice Education

 Bachelor of Science in Criminology

Institute of Information Technology

 Bachelor in Science in Information Technology

Calatrava Campus

 Bachelor in Elementary Education
 Bachelor of Science in Agriculture
 Bachelor of Science in Forestry
 Bachelor of Science in Fisheries
 Bachelor of Science in Environmental Science

San Agustin Campus

 Master in Educational Management
 Bachelor of Science in Fisheries
 Bachelor of Elementary Education

Sta. Maria Campus

 Bachelor of Elementary Education
 Bachelor of Science in Fisheries

Sta. Fe Campus

 Bachelor in Elementary Education
 Bachelor in Secondary Education
 Bachelor of Science in Fisheries

San Andres Campus

 Bachelor of Elementary Education
 Bachelor of Science in Fisheries

Cajidiocan Campus

 Bachelor of Secondary Education
 Bachelor of Elementary Education
 Bachelor of Science in Information Technology
 Bachelor of Agricultural Technology (BAT)

Romblon Campus

 Bachelor of Science in Business Administration
 Bachelor of Science in Information Technology
 Bachelor of Science in Elementary Education
 Bachelor of Secondary Education

San Fernando Campus

 Masters of Arts in Educational Management
 Masters of Arts in Educational Major in English
 Bachelor in Elementary Education
 Bachelor in Secondary Education
 Bachelor in Technical-Vocational Teacher Education (BTTE)
 Drafting Technology
 Automotive Technology
 Food & Service Management
 Bachelor of Science in Business Administration
 Bachelor of Science in Information Technology
 Bachelor of Science in Hotel & Restaurant Management
 Computer Operation and Programming (COP)
 Certificate in Industrial Technology (CIT)

Charter
Romblon State College became Romblon State University upon the approval of Republic Act No. 9721 by President Gloria Macapagal Arroyo in 2009.

Campuses and locations
Romblon State University Odiongan - Main Campus
Romblon State University Romblon - Sawang Campus
Romblon State University in Sibuyan - Cajidiocan Campus
Romblon State University in Sibuyan - Sibuyan Polytechnic College, San Fernando Campus
Romblon State University in Tablas - Romblon College of Fisheries and Forestry, San Agustin Campus
Romblon State University in Tablas - Romblon College of Fisheries and Forestry, San Andres Campus
Romblon State University in Tablas - Santa Fe Campus
Romblon State University in Tablas - Santa Maria Campus

References

External links
Romblon State University Website
Universities and colleges in Romblon